Anthony "Tony" Reynolds Hale is a major general in the United States Army who serves as the Commanding General of the United States Army Intelligence Center of Excellence and Fort Huachuca (USAICoE & FH). Hale became the USAICoE & FH Commanding General in August 2020, replacing Lieutenant General Laura A. Potter. He was promoted to his current rank of major general on February 25, 2021 in a ceremony at Fort Huachuca featuring General George W. Casey Jr. and General Austin S. Miller. He previously served as the United States Special Operations Command (SOCOM) J-2. He received his officer's commission in 1990 through the ROTC program at North Carolina State University.

Educational Degrees 

 Bachelor of Arts Degree in Political Science from North Carolina State University at Raleigh, NC
 Master of Arts Degree in National Security and Strategic Studies from the Naval War College at Newport, RI

Military Schools Attended 

 Military Intelligence Officer Basic & Advanced Courses at Fort Huachuca, AZ
 United States Naval Command & Staff College at Newport, RI
 Senior Service College Fellow at the University of North Carolina at Chapel Hill in Chapel Hill, NC

Military career

Operational deployments 
 Deputy Chief of Staff, Intelligence, Resolute Support Mission, North Atlantic Treaty Organization/Director, J-2, United States Forces-Afghanistan OPERATION FREEDOM'S SENTINEL & RESOLUTE SUPPORT
 Commander, 519th Military Intelligence Battalion (Airborne),OPERATION ENDURING FREEDOM, Afghanistan
 Aide-de-Camp to the Commander, United States Forces-Iraq, OPERATION IRAQI FREEDOM, Iraq
 Exercise and Training Officer, United States Army Office of Military Support, OPERATION ENDURING FREEDOM, Afghanistan
 Assistant Operations Officer, 501st Military Intelligence Battalion, 1st Brigade, 1st Armored Division, OPERATION JOINT ENDEAVOR, Bosnia-Herzegovina

Dates of Rank

Recognitions and Honors 
Hale's decorations and badges include the following:

References 

United States Army generals
Major generals
Living people

Year of birth missing (living people)